Robert Estes (born July 22, 1963) is an American actor. He is known for his roles as Harry Wilson on the teen drama series 90210, as Sgt. Chris Lorenzo on the crime drama series Silk Stalkings, and as Kyle McBride on the primetime soap opera Melrose Place.

Career
Estes first became interested in  an acting career while training to be a stunt double. One of his first acting jobs was in the soap opera Days of Our Lives playing Glenn Gallagher (1986–1987). He later gained widespread recognition for his role as Sergeant Chris Lorenzo in Silk Stalkings (1991–1995), half of the "dynamic duo" alongside Mitzi Kapture.

In 1993, Estes had a guest role on the prime time Fox soap opera Melrose Place, playing Sam Towler. Three years later, the producers of the series brought him back but cast him in a different role, that of restaurateur Kyle McBride. Estes played the role from 1996 to the series' cancellation in 1999.

Following Melrose Place he had guest starring roles on Providence, Suddenly Susan, Law & Order: Special Victims Unit and Gilmore Girls. He also performed in theatre, and had roles in Same Time, Next Year (2004) and The Lake (2005).

Estes starred in the comedy film I Do, They Don't (previously titled Blended), which premiered on ABC Family in March 2005 and also starred his Melrose Place co-star and then-wife Josie Bissett. He made his return to series television playing Sean Cole in the ABC television crime drama The Evidence.

He completed a recurring role on CSI: Miami as Nick Townsend, the abusive ex-husband of Natalia Boa Vista. In a January 2007 episode, he was murdered by the husband of a killer to cover up her crime.

Estes then portrayed Lieutenant Tom Hogan, Inspector Lindsay Boxer's ex-husband and current boss in the ABC police procedural and legal drama Women's Murder Club.

In May 2008, Estes was cast as Harry Wilson in 90210 on The CW. The series, like Melrose Place before it, is a spin-off from the original 1990s series Beverly Hills, 90210, marking Estes' third appearance in the franchise.

On January 20, 2010, Estes announced that the second season of 90210 would be his last. "This is my final season on 90210 and I wish the show, cast and crew nothing but the best. I am looking forward to spending time with my kids and exploring other opportunities", Estes said in a statement.

Personal life
Estes attended Santa Monica High School and is a graduate of the University of Southern California where he was a member of the Alpha Tau Omega fraternity.

On May 1, 1992, Estes married actress Josie Bissett, another cast member of Melrose Place. In 2005, they separated, with Estes reportedly moving out of their Seattle home at his wife's request. The couple have two children together. In January 2006 the couple announced their plans to divorce.

On June 15, 2010, Estes married teacher and surfer Erin Bolte. They have a son Makai Ever, born April 29, 2011. Estes resides in San Clemente, California with his wife Erin and two sons, Mason and Makai.

Filmography

Film

Television

Sources

External links
 

1963 births
20th-century American male actors
21st-century American male actors
American male film actors
American male soap opera actors
American male stage actors
American male television actors
Living people
Male actors from Virginia
Actors from Norfolk, Virginia
University of Southern California alumni